Inga Kožarenoka (born 16 March 1982 in Saldus) is a javelin thrower from Latvia. Her personal best throw is 59.97 metres, achieved in June 2005 in Murjani. At the time it became Latvian record. She has been coached by Valentīna Eiduka.

She won the silver medal at the 2002 World Junior Championships, finished eleventh at the 2002 European Championships and fifth at the 2005 Summer Universiade.

Achievements

References

External links
 
 
 

1982 births
Living people
Latvian female javelin throwers
Athletes (track and field) at the 2000 Summer Olympics
Olympic athletes of Latvia